Slim is an American pop/rock band from Oakland, California, led by singer/songwriter Michael Baker.  The band's music balances lyrical expression with a devotion to the sounds and beats of rock, soul, and hip-hop.  Their debut album, Interstate Medicine, was originally released in 2002.

The band's roots lie in the San Francisco Bay Area coffeehouse and open mic circuit, where Baker performed for several years while writing the material that would appear on "Interstate Medicine".  In early 2001, former Counting Crows and Third Eye Blind drummer Steve Bowman brought Baker together with producer Jeffrey Wood (Fatboy Slim, Penelope Houston), and sessions for the album began at Fantasy Studios in Berkeley, California.

In addition to Bowman on drums and Paul Olguin (Mazzy Star, Mary Wells) on bass, the album features a number of notable local musicians.  Chief among these are Jef Labes (Van Morrison, Bonnie Raitt) on keys and Robert Powell (Peter Gabriel, John Lee Hooker, Jackson Browne) on pedal steel guitar.

The album's songs address a diverse range of topics, from Spanish conquistadores to double murders, deals with the devil to nights spent in thrall to Mexican witches.  Instrumentation is similarly diverse: the opening track, "Cortez & Pizarro", begins with rubato flamenco guitar which transforms abruptly into distorted Les Paul through a Marshall stack.  "Starfish/Sunflower" mates sampled jungle snares with pedal steel guitar and three-part vocal harmonies, and "Sister Rosa" combines folk-blues guitar with a  gospel choir.

Slim now performs around Northern California, with a lineup consisting of drummer Peter Libby (Primus, Ramona the Pest) bassist Kevin Witte (Surreal Neil, Tom Jonesing) and Tom Hamilton on keys and backing vocals.  Hamilton and Baker occasionally perform as an acoustic duo.  Baker plays solo shows, and also with his other band, Radio Nowhere.

Discography
 Interstate Medicine (Shortwave Syndicate, 2002)
Track Listing:
1) Cortez & Pizarro
2) Heathrow
3) Slide
4) Beautiful Stranger
5) Curandera
6) Starfish/Sunflower
7) Picture of You
8) Caroline
9) Sister Rosa
10) Alabama
11) Electric
12) Deathwish Debbie
13) Walking Shoes (Hidden Track)
14) Turned on Fashion

Lineup
 Michael Baker - guitar, vocals, songs, production
 Peter Libby - drums
 Kevin Witte - bass
 Tom Hamilton - vocals, keyboards

American pop rock music groups